Rai Umanath Bali belonged to the erstwhile family of Rampur-Daryabad Estate in Oudh.  He was a Member of Legislative Council of Uttar Pradesh and also represented Barabanki district as the Chairman of its District Board. He was an ardent Congressman and was affiliated to the Indian National Congress. He was a Member of the British Indian Association, Oudh (also called the Anjuman-e-Hind, Oudh) - an Organisation of the Taluqdars of Oudh.

He also established the Bhatkhande Sangit Vidyapith  at Lucknow, an examining and affiliating body that conducts examinations and awards diplomas in Vocal, Instrumental and Indian Classical Dance and Music. Today, the Bhatkhande Sangit Vidyapith is managed by his grandson, Rai Swareshwar Bali under the Presidency of Former Agriculture Minister & Several time Member of parliament, Raja Anand Singh.

Today, the Rai Umanath Bali Auditorium in Lucknow and Rai Umanath Bali Mahila Mahavidyalaya, Daryabad is named after him.

Family
Rai Umanath Bali was survived by four sons and two daughters. His eldest son, Brajeshwar Bali succeeded him as the Vice President of Bhatkhande Sangit Vidyapith.

His grandson, Rai Swareshwar Bali, is now the Vice President of Bhatkhande Sangit Vidyapith. Swareshwar has also been involved in Politics of Barabanki District, changing political parties from time to time. His great-grandson, Sanidhya Sanjai Bali, was actively involved in student and youth politics of the Indian National Congress. Though, he is currently working as a Psephologist, Pollster & Political Strategist under his startup, ARIES.

References

External links
History of Bhatkhande Music Institute
Hindustani Classical Reform Movement
Bhatkhande Music Institute University
Bhatkhande Music College Celebrating Platinum Jubilee

Year of birth missing
Year of death missing
Indian National Congress politicians from Uttar Pradesh
Indian royalty
Members of the Uttar Pradesh Legislative Council